Songs of the West is a compilation of "western"-themed songs by Emmylou Harris taken from eight of her previous albums originally released between 1975 and 1992.

Track listing

References

Albums produced by Allen Reynolds
Albums produced by Brian Ahern (producer)
Emmylou Harris compilation albums
1994 compilation albums
Warner Records compilation albums